Magdalena Kemnitz (born 13 March 1985 in Poznań) is a Polish rower.

References 
 
 

1985 births
Living people
Polish female rowers
Sportspeople from Poznań
Olympic rowers of Poland
Rowers at the 2004 Summer Olympics
World Rowing Championships medalists for Poland
European Rowing Championships medalists